Baby Mama is a 2008 American romantic comedy film written and directed by Michael McCullers in his directorial debut and starring Tina Fey, Amy Poehler, Greg Kinnear, Dax Shepard, Romany Malco, Maura Tierney, Holland Taylor, with Steve Martin, and Sigourney Weaver.

Plot
Successful single businesswoman Kate Holbrook has always prioritized her career over her personal life. Now at age 37, she finally decides to have her own child, but discovers she has a T-shaped uterus, minimizing her chances of becoming pregnant. Also denied the chance to adopt, Kate hires immature, obnoxious, South Philadelphian Angie Ostrowski to become her surrogate mother.

After learning from Chaffee Bicknell, the steely head of their surrogacy center, that Angie has become pregnant, Kate prepares for motherhood in her own typically driven fashion; reading childcare books, baby-proofing the apartment, and researching top pre-schools. However, her strategy is upended when Angie shows up at her door, homeless. Their conflicting personalities put them at odds as Kate learns first-hand about balancing motherhood and career, especially when she begins dating the owner of a local blended-juice cafe, Rob Ackerman.

Unbeknownst to Kate, Angie's in-vitro fertilization procedure had failed and she is feigning the pregnancy, hoping to ultimately run off with her payment. She starts to regret lying, but continually puts off confessing. When Angie gets an ultrasound, she discovers she is indeed pregnant. Realizing the baby is her own - with her common-law husband Carl, from whom she is separated - Angie is forced to confess at Kate's baby shower. Kate explains to Angie that the pregnancy test was supposed to be taken two weeks after the procedure, so the baby could still belong to her.

A court hearing determines that the baby is Angie's, and Angie impassionedly apologizes to Kate. As the women meet face-to-face after the proceedings, Angie's water breaks and Kate rushes her to the hospital, then passes out during the birth. As she wakes up, the doctor supervising Angie tells Kate that she's two months pregnant (the result of her relationship with Rob). After receiving the news, she visits Angie, who is holding her newborn daughter Stef, named for Gwen Stefani. Kate forgives Angie and they become best friends, ultimately changing each other for the better.

A year later at Stef's first-birthday party, Kate and Rob have had a daughter and are engaged, and Angie and Kate have retained a sister-like relationship. Although he does not reunite with Angie, Carl stays close to his daughter and takes parenting classes. In the final scene, Angie and Kate sit in front of a television set with their daughters, watching Tom and Jerry cartoons.

Cast

 Tina Fey as Katherine "Kate" Holbrook - Mother
 Amy Poehler as Angela "Angie" Ostrowski - Surrogate mother
 Greg Kinnear as Rob Ackerman - SuperFruity cafe owner
 Dax Shepard as Carl Loomis - Angie's 'Common Law' husband
 Sigourney Weaver as Chaffee Bicknell - Surrogate agent
 Steve Martin as Barry Waterman - Kate's boss - Round Earth Organic Market
 Romany Malco as Oscar Priyan - Doorman
 Maura Tierney as Caroline - Kate's sister
 Holland Taylor as Rose Holbrook - Kate's mother
 Stephen Mailer as Dan
 Siobhan Fallon Hogan as The Birthing Teacher
 Kevin Collins as Rick - Round Earth employee
 Will Forte as Scott - Kate's former boyfriend
 Denis O'Hare as Dr. Manheim
 Fred Armisen as The Stroller Salesman
 James Rebhorn as Judge
 John Hodgman as Fertility Specialist
 Thomas McCarthy as Kate's Date
 Jason Mantzoukas as Jonothan - Surrogate father
 Dave Finkel as Gay Couple
 Brian Stack as Dave

Reception

Critical reception

On review aggregator Rotten Tomatoes, the film holds an approval rating of 63% based on 166 reviews, with an average rating of 6.20/10. The website's critics consensus reads: "Baby Mama is a lightweight, predictable comedy that ekes by on the strength of its performers." On Metacritic, the film has a weighted average score of 55 out of 100, based on 34 critics, indicating "mixed or average reviews". Audiences polled by CinemaScore gave the film an average grade of "B+" on an A+ to F scale.

Box office
In its opening weekend, Baby Mama grossed $17,407,110 in 2,543 theaters in the United States and Canada, ranking #1 at the box office and averaging $6,845 per theater.  Baby Mama eventually grossed a total of $64,163,648.  Its production budget was $30 million.

Home media
Baby Mama was released on September 9, 2008, on both DVD and Blu-ray. Extras included commentary with writer/director Michael McCullers and cast members Tina Fey and Amy Poehler, From Conception to Delivery: The Making of Baby Mama featurette, an alternate ending, deleted scenes, and Saturday Night Live: Legacy of Laughter.

References

External links
 
 
 
 
 

2008 films
2000s buddy comedy films
2008 romantic comedy films
2000s pregnancy films
American female buddy films
American romantic comedy films
2000s English-language films
Films set in Pennsylvania
Films set in Philadelphia
Films shot in New York City
Films shot in Philadelphia
American pregnancy films
Relativity Media films
Films about surrogacy
Films produced by Lorne Michaels
Universal Pictures films
Films with screenplays by Michael McCullers
2008 directorial debut films
2000s female buddy films
2000s American films